Maine School Administrative District 27 is the northernmost school district in the U.S. state of Maine. It includes the territory of the former M.S.A.D. 10, which encompassed the town of Allagash, Maine until the mid-1990s. MSAD 27 is based in Fort Kent, Maine. SAD 27 rejected a proposed unified school project that would involve building a new high school in a location it disagreed with.

The School district is composed of the following schools:

 Community High School at Fort Kent, pop. 380+ as of 2006
 Eagle Lake Elementary School, pop. 80+ as of 2006
 Fort Kent Elementary School, pop. 620+ as of 2006
 Saint Francis Elementary School, pop. 90+ as of 2006
 Wallagrass Elementary School, pop. 60+ as of 2006

Towns which have current student attendance in MSAD are:

 Allagash
 Eagle Lake
 Fort Kent
 New Canada
 Saint Francis
 Wallagrass

References

External links

27
Education in Aroostook County, Maine